Bukowiec Wielki is a village in the administrative district of Gmina Janowiec Kościelny, within Nidzica County, Warmian-Masurian Voivodeship, in northern Poland.

The village has a population of 50.

References

Bukowiec Wielki